Juliette Plumecocq-Mech is a French actress.

Biography 
Originally from Bordeaux, she entered the Bordeaux Conservatory of Dramatic Arts. She then joined Ariane Mnouchkine's Théâtre du Soleil troupe. There she met the actor Christophe Rauck who created the Compagnie Terrain Vague in 1995, which Juliette joined. 

Because of her androgynous physique, Christophe Rauck also entrusted her with male roles (Lancelot in Le Dragon, Khlestakov in Le Révizor, Aristarque in Cœur ardent), and in 2016 directed her in an original text where she plays, lying down, a man assaulted in a cafe.

Juliette Plumecocq-Mech is also pursuing a career in cinema (with Romain Goupil, and Jean-Pierre Améris) and television (the series Cherif, Le Tueur du lac).

In 2021, she appeared in the play A la vie by Élise Chatauret, Thomas Pondevie and the Compagnie Babel.

Filmography 

 2011 : Mon arbre of Bérenice André: Lydia
 2012 : Radiostars de Romain Lévy: Daniel(le)
 2014 : Les Jours venus of Romain Goupil: Guide aveugle
 2018 : Je vais mieux of Jean-Pierre Améris: la radiologue
 2018 : Je ne suis pas un homme facile of Éléonore Pourriat: la borgne
 2018 : Tous les dieux du ciel of Quarxx: la garagiste
 2020 : Médecin de nuit of Élie Wajeman : Chloé
 2020 : Antoinette dans les Cévennes of Caroline Vignal : Brintney
 2022 : Les Vedettes of Jonathan Barré : Patricia 
 2022 : Trois fois rien of Nadège Loiseau ; the doctor

Television 

 2014 : Saison 4 de Hero Corp : Iancu
 2014 : Meurtres au Pays basque of Éric Duret : Faustine
 2015 : Saison 2 des Petits Meurtres d'Agatha Christie, épisode Murder Party: Greenblat
 2017 : Cherif, épisode La dernière séance : Nathalie Marchal
 2017 : Transferts, série : Fausto
 2017 : Le Tueur du lac, series of Jérôme Cornuau : Jeanne Tardieu
 2018 : Tunnel, series of Anders Engstrom : Betty
 2019 : Engrenages, saison 7
 2019 : Saison 2 Balthazar, Épisode 9, La loi du plus fort : Catherine Meyer
 2020 : Peur sur le lac, mini-series of Jérôme Cornuau : Jeanne Tardieu
 2020 : Le Mensonge, mini-series of Vincent Garenq : La présidente du tribunal
 2022 : Vise le cœur, mini-series of Vincent Jamain : doctor Grandjean 
 2022 : Vortex, mini-series of Slimane-Baptiste Berhoun : Agathe
 2022 : Alex Hugo of Olivier Langlois, épisode : En terre sauvage : Anne Barois 
 2022 : Bellefond of Emilie Barbault and Sarah Barbault, téléfilm : Andrée Cranjeon

References 

French actors